The Contaflex series is a family of 35mm leaf-shuttered SLR cameras, produced by Zeiss Ikon in the 1950s and 1960s. The name was first used in 1935 on a 35mm Twin-lens reflex camera, the Contaflex TLR also by Zeiss Ikon, the -flex part in the name referring to integral mirror for the viewfinder. The first models, the Contaflex I and II have fixed lenses, while the later models have interchangeable lenses, and eventually the Contaflexes became a camera system with a wide variety of accessories.

History
The first Contaflex SLR was introduced in 1953 as one of the earliest 35mm SLR cameras equipped with a leaf shutter, but with a fixed lens. The Mecaflex was presented at photokina in 1951 and launched two years later with a leaf shutter behind the removable lens, while the Hasselblad 500C of 1957 has a leaf shutter in its interchangeable lens. This design, using a leaf shutter in an SLR, involves a complex sequence of events when the shutter is released, more looked upon as a challenge than a drawback at Zeiss Ikon, but no Contaflex model ever got a rapid return mirror. The advantages are low manufacturing costs, compactness and flash synchronization at all shutter speeds. However, only a very limited range of interchangeable lenses became available. For the models I and II, having a fixed lens, only three add-on converters were offered using a slide-on adapter, but from models III and IV onwards interchangeable lenses from 35mm to 115mm focal length were provided; at the time regarded as quite sufficient, as most would only be used with the standard lens anyway.

Three years later, during 1956, the Kodak Retina Reflex was launched, followed by the Voigtländer Bessamatic and the Ultramatic. The market soon flourished with leaf-shuttered SLR cameras. These mechanical complex cameras required precision assembly and high quality materials. More often than not many camera makes suffered from reliability issues, while the few better ones performed well, selling in quantity.

Contaflex I and II

The Contaflex I, launched in 1953, was equipped with a fixed Zeiss Tessar 45mm f:2.8 lens with front-cell focusing. The very first Contaflex I had a Synchro-Compur shutter with the old scale of shutter speeds (1-2-5-10-25-50-100-250-500), but very soon it adopted the new scale 1-2-4-8-15-30-60-125-250-500.

The Contaflex II, introduced the following year, was the same camera with an uncoupled selenium meter added to one side of the front plate.

Both had a fixed lens but to the front of which could be attached a supplementary lens, called the Teleskop 1.7x.

Contaflex III and IV
The Contaflex III, launched in 1956, was the same as the I, but equipped with a Zeiss Tessar 50mm f:2.8 with helical focusing. The front element of the lens was removable and could be replaced by supplementary lenses, discussed in the section Contaflex lenses.

The Contaflex IV, introduced the same year, was the same camera with the uncoupled meter inherited from the Contaflex II.

Contaflex IV

Contaflex Alpha and Beta
The Contaflex Alpha and Contaflex Beta, both introduced in 1957, were based on the same body but equipped with a Zeiss Pantar 45mm f:2.8 three-element lens and a Prontor Reflex shutter up to 1/300. They were the cheaper models of the line.
The Alpha had no meter and the Beta had the selenium meter of the II and IV.

The front element of the lens could be interchanged with others for 30mm f:4 and 75mm f:4. These could also be used on the Contina III 35mm viewfinder camera.

Contaflex Rapid and Super

The Contaflex Rapid was introduced in 1958 and had a slightly longer body, a built-in accessory shoe, a winding lever and a rewind crank. It was the meterless version.

The Contaflex Super, launched the following year, was based on the Rapid and had a coupled selenium exposure meter on the front side of the prism. It is easily recognized by the wheel on the front plate for the setting of the film speed (DIN). The meter needle was visible in the finder as well as on the top plate from the outside. It is not to be confused with the Super (new) that will be discussed later.

The Rapid and Super could take the same supplementary lenses as the III and IV.

Contaflex Prima
The Contaflex Prima, launched in 1959 and sold until 1965, was based on the body of the Rapid, but with the Pantar lenses and the Prontor shutter like the Alpha and Beta. The Prima had a coupled exposure meter placed on the side of the front plate, different from that of the Super.

The Prima could take the Pantar supplementary lenses like the Alpha and Beta.

Contaflex Super (new) and Super B

The Contaflex Super (new) and Contaflex Super B are very similar cameras. Both have a new body design, being longer  with added bulk. The information about which came first is a bit contradictory in some reference books, but it seems the Super (new) was launched in 1962, introducing the new body design and a new selenium exposure meter in a prominent rectangle marked Zeiss Ikon in front of the prism. The aperture wheel was replaced by a more traditional aperture command, and the meter read-out was visible both on the exterior and in the finder.

The Super B was launched in 1963, and added a shutter-priority automatic aperture, and maybe some other small changes.

The new body of the Super (new) and Super B allowed them to take magazine backs, interchangeable with a partly exposed film inside. (Magazine backs, rare among 35mm cameras, were also supplied for the Contarex of Zeiss Ikon.)

From the Super (new) and Super B, the Zeiss Tessar 50mm f:2.8 lens was recomputed and supposedly performed better. They could still take the same supplementary lenses, with one exception discussed in the relevant section.

Contaflex Super BC and S
The Contaflex Super BC was introduced in 1965, and was a Super B with the selenium meter replaced by a CdS through-the-lens exposure meter. It still had a black rectangle marked Zeiss Ikon on the front of the prism, but it was only decorative. It had a battery compartment at the bottom front.

The Contaflex S was the last variant, introduced in 1968, and was simply a renamed Super BC. It had a black rectangle marked Contaflex S on the front, and a different, newer Zeiss Ikon logo. It proudly sported the word Automatic on the front of the shutter.

The Super BC and S could take the magazine backs, as well as the usual supplementary lenses.

Both the Contaflex Super BC and S were, along with the 126-format Contaflex 126, available in chrome or black finish.

Former Zeiss-Ikon chief designer Hubert Nerwin, who designed the famous CONTAX 2 and 3 (besides other cameras for Zeiss-Ikon) later invented the 126 film cassette. This was after he emigrated to the U.S. after World War 2 and was working for Kodak.

Contaflex lenses
We have already seen that the Contaflex I and II could only take the Teleskop 1.7x supplementary lenses, and that the Alpha, Beta and Prima had their own limited range of Pantar supplementary lenses.

The models III, IV, Rapid, Super, Super (new), Super B, Super BC and S all have a Zeiss Tessar 50mm f:2.8 lens (27mm screw-in or 28.5mm push-on filters) with interchangeable front element.
All of them can take a small range of supplementary lenses:
 Zeiss Pro-Tessar 35/4 (49mm filters), later replaced by the Pro-Tessar 35/3.2 (60mm screw-over filters)
 Zeiss Pro-Tessar 85/4 (60mm screw-over filters), later replaced by the Pro-Tessar 85/3.2 (60mm filters)
 Zeiss Pro-Tessar 115/4 (67mm filters)
 Monocular 8x30B, equivalent to a 400mm lens (attaches to the 50mm f/2.8 Tessar lens).

There was also a Zeiss Pro-Tessar M 1:1 supplementary lens, that kept the focal length of 50mm but allowed 1:1 reproduction.  The effective speed of the M 1:1 lens is f/5.6.
The 50mm standard front elements, as well as the Pro-Tessar M 1:1 elements, were different between the early models III, IV, Rapid and Super with the old model of Tessar, and the later models Super (new), Super B, Super BC and S with the recomputed Tessar. It appears that the mount was very slightly modified, and it seems physically impossible to mismatch the elements as the journal diameter
above the bayonet mount had been reduced by approximately .006"

There were also stereo attachments:
 Steritar A for the Contaflex I and II
 Steritar B for the other Tessar-equipped models
 Near Steritar for close up stereo pictures .2 – 2.5 meters
(Normally interchangeable with the older Tessar line of Steritar B camera lenses)
 Steritar D for the Pantar-equipped models

A complete line of these Contaflex Steritar lenses can be seen at (https://www.flickr.com/photos/12670411@N02/)

Zeiss  Proxar for Contaflex:  1M,0.5M,0.3M,0.2M and  0.1M

Contaflex 126

The Contaflex 126 is a completely different body. Its only relation to the rest of the Contaflex family is its name. It was introduced in 1967 to accept Kodak 126 (Instamatic) cartridges. It was one of the very few SLRs taking 126 film, and one of the very few ambitious cameras using that film. (Two other examples of 126 SLRs are the Rollei SL26 and Kodak Instamatic Reflex.)

The Contaflex 126 is an SLR with a focal-plane shutter and interchangeable lenses. 
It was available in chrome or black finish.

The range of lenses was:
 Zeiss Distagon 25/4
 Zeiss Distagon 32/2.8
 Zeiss Pantar 45/2.8, three-element, cheaper
 Zeiss Tessar 45/2.8, four-element, better
 Zeiss Sonnar 85/2.8
 Zeiss Tele-Tessar 135/4
 Zeiss Tele-Tessar 200/4

The Contaflex 126 lenses are often confused with other lenses by the sellers. They can only be used on the Contaflex 126 body, that can only take the obsolete 126 cartridge, so the value of these lenses is not very high, despite their famous names.

The Weber SL75
When Zeiss Ikon stopped making cameras in 1972, they had prototypes in various stages of development. One of them was the SL725, which would be a successor to the Contaflex line with an electronic shutter. The prototype ended in the hands of a company named Weber, which presented the camera at a photokina show under the name Weber SL75, but could not afford to put it into production, and did not find a partner to do so.
The lens mount was a modification of the Contarex camera lens mount. Carl Zeiss advertised a range of lenses for the Weber SL75, all with the T* multicoating:
 18/4 Distagon
 25/2.8 Distagon
 35/2.8 Distagon
 50/1.4 Planar
 85/2.8 Sonnar
 135/2.8 Sonnar
 200/3.5 Tele-Tessar

An eBay seller seems to have uncovered a small stock of the Planar lens, and has recently sold a couple of them.. Recently (2021), several of these lenses have surfaced again and were sold on eBay. No SL75 body seems to have surfaced so far, and the only picture found on the web is here and from an Italian photo magazine as a preview in their Nov. 1974 issue, as seen to the right.

Accessories
Slip on  metal lens hood
Screw in  metal lens hood
Film back
Zeiss Proxar lens set

Notes

Bibliography
Freytag, H,  The Contaflex Way, Focal Press, 3rd ed, 1959
 Barringer, C. and Small, M. Zeiss Compendium East and West — 1940–1972. Small Dole, UK: Hove Books, 1999 (2nd edition). .

External links
  Contaflex II and Contaflex S at La Chambre Claire
  Contaflex 126 at www.collection-appareils.com by Sylvain Halgand
  Contaflex II at www.collection-appareils.com by Sylvain Halgand
  User manuals, Ads about Contaflex at www.collection-appareils.com by Sylvain Halgand

SLR cameras